The Sulawesi lilac kingfisher (Cittura cyanotis) is a species of kingfisher in the genus Cittura, found in the lowlands of the Indonesia island of Sulawesi and Lembeh.

Taxonomy
The specific epithet cyanotis is from classical Greek kuanos for "dark blue" and -ōtis" for "eared". The first formal description of the Sulawesi lilac kingfishers were by the Dutch zoologist Coenraad Jacob Temminck in 1824 under the binomial name Dacelo cyanotis.

Description
It has the typical kingfisher shape, with a short tail and long bill. The adult male has a brown crown and back and rufous rump and tail. It has a blue eye mask, separated from the crown by a white line, and a pale lilac ruff of long stiffened ear covert feathers. The underparts are white and the wings are blue, separated by a white line from the brown back. The red bill is large and flattened. In flight, the underwings are white with a black "wrist" patch.

The call is a rapid ku-ku-ku-ku''.

Behaviour
The Sulawesi lilac kingfisher is found in lowland rainforest and drier hill forest up to  altitude.

It perches motionless on a low branch watching for its prey, mainly large insects, on the ground below. Little else is known of the behaviour of this species, and no nests have been found.

Status
This species has a restricted range and fragmented distribution, and is uncommon, with no records from south Sulawesi. Lowland deforestation has been extensive in recent decades, and the loss of its habitat has led to lilac kingfisher being classed as near-threatened.

Gallery

References 

Cittura
Birds described in 1824
Taxa named by Coenraad Jacob Temminck